Alexandr Nikolayevich Sukhorukov (born 22 February 1988) is a Russian competitive swimmer who specializes in freestyle events.  He competed in the 200 m freestyle and 4 × 200 m freestyle relay at the 2008 Olympics, the 4 × 200 m relay at the 2012 Olympics and the 4 × 100 m freestyle at the 2016 Olympics and won a silver medal in the relay in 2008.

Early life and education
Sukhorukov learned swimming from his mother, Svetlana, a professional swimming coach, and started systematic training at age 14 under Oleg Litvinenko and Sergei Fyodorov. In 2004 he was selected for the national team. After graduating from the Ukhta Technical University he moved to Saint Petersburg.

Personal life
In 2016, Sukhorukov became engaged to his girlfriend of three years, Olympic rhythmic gymnastics champion Margarita Mamun. They now have one son.

References

1988 births
Living people
People from Ukhta
Russian male swimmers
Olympic swimmers of Russia
Olympic silver medalists for Russia
Swimmers at the 2008 Summer Olympics
Swimmers at the 2012 Summer Olympics
Swimmers at the 2016 Summer Olympics
World record holders in swimming
Russian male freestyle swimmers
World Aquatics Championships medalists in swimming
Medalists at the FINA World Swimming Championships (25 m)
European Aquatics Championships medalists in swimming
Medalists at the 2008 Summer Olympics
Olympic silver medalists in swimming
Universiade medalists in swimming
Universiade gold medalists for Russia
Sportspeople from the Komi Republic
Medalists at the 2013 Summer Universiade